Phyllonorycter pastorella is a moth of the family Gracillariidae. It is known from all of Europe (except the British Isles, Greece, Portugal, Denmark, Norway, Luxembourg  and the Mediterranean islands), east to Russia, China and Japan.

The wingspan is 8-9.5 mm.

The larvae feed on Populus alba, P. nigra, Salix alba, S. babylonica, S. pentandra, S. purpurea, Salix × sepulcralis, S. triandra and S. viminalis. They mine the leaves of their host plant. They create a large, lower-surface tentiform mine with one sharp fold. The cocoon is formed within the mine, where pupation takes place. The frass is deposited at one end of the mine, while the cocoon forms at the  opposite end.

References

External links
 
 Phyllonorycter pastorella at British Leafminers

pastorella
Moths described in 1846
Moths of Asia
Moths of Europe
Taxa named by Philipp Christoph Zeller